SS Hendrik Willem Van Loon was a liberty ship built in the United States during World War II. She was named after Hendrik Willem Van Loon, a Dutch-American historian, journalist, and children's book author.

Construction
Hendrik Willem Van Loon was laid down on 5 May 1944, under a Maritime Commission (MARCOM) contract, MC hull 2482, by the St. Johns River Shipbuilding Company, Jacksonville, Florida; sponsored by Eliza Helen van Loon, the widow of the namesake, and was launched on 14 June 1944.

History
She was allocated to the United States Lines, on 2 July 1944. On 15 May 1947, she was laid up in the National Defense Reserve Fleet, Astoria, Oregon. On 1 July 1954, she was withdrawn from the fleet to be loaded with grain under the "Grain Program 1954", she returned loaded on 15 July 1954. On 8 October 1956, she was withdrawn to be unload, she returned on empty 12 October 1956. She was sold for scrapping, 19 April 1965, to Zidell Explorations, Inc., for $46,111.64. She was removed from the fleet on 21 May 1965.

References

Bibliography

 
 
 
 

 

Liberty ships
Ships built in Jacksonville, Florida
1944 ships
Astoria Reserve Fleet
Astoria Reserve Fleet Grain Program